Cries from the Heart (also known as Touch of Truth) is a 1994 American made-for-television drama film directed by Michael Switzer and starring Patty Duke and Melissa Gilbert, who had co-starred together in two prior films.

Plot 

Karen Barth (Gilbert) is the divorced mother of Michael (Pierce), a 7-year-old young autistic boy who is unable to speak or write. After an incident in which Michael wanders away from home to the local playground, Karen's ex-husband Roger realizes that Michael may need more specialized care than she can provide, and suggests Michael be enrolled in a special residential school.

Reluctant to do so, Karen nonetheless agrees to visit the campus, where she meets with therapist Terry Wilson (Duke), who explains just how the program will be able to help Michael, which finally convinces Karen to enroll him, although she is put off by the school's requirement that she not visit for 6 weeks. Initially clashing with Terry's approach, Karen grudgingly comes to realize that the separation period is necessary for adjustment and takes a job at a local greenhouse. Meanwhile, Michael begins gradually making progress, learning such basics as tying his shoes, in addition to such chores as making his bed and helping prepare meals in the cottage he shares with his caretaker, Jeff.

Eventually, Terry suggests to Jeff and school head Eliot that they try a form of facilitated communication: having Michael type his thoughts on a computer keyboard, with Terry guiding his hand. Eliot is reluctant, but Jeff is outright dismissive, claiming Michael's "not that bright" and "can't even spell." However, Eliot finally agrees to give Terry a one-month trial period with Michael (and only Michael) to see if it works.

Initially, Michael only types gibberish, but Terry keeps at it, and a breakthrough finally occurs when Karen comes for a visit and, in an emotional moment, he types a greeting of "MOM HI" to her, finally breaking his long silence.

Karen then asks Michael if he knows how much she loves him, to which he types "YES", and then he types "DAD GONE", and Karen agrees with that statement. Michael then reveals something she had never known when he types "I BRAK CAR MY FALT". Shocked by this, Karen tells Michael, "No. No, honey, not your fault." Then she tells Terry that the night she and Roger divorced, Michael got upset, and broke the car window. Karen assures him the car was not the reason for their divorce; instead, she and Roger weren't getting along. She then tells Michael that both she and Roger love him very much, and kisses his head.

Later, Karen shares news of her first conversation with Michael to an initially skeptical Roger, admitting to having been wrong about Terry before and thanking him for recommending the school. After mentioning the revelation that Michael thought the divorce was his fault, Roger expresses guilt over having never explained the reason for his departure, but Karen assures him that she set Michael straight, and even if he's not convinced, he'll now be able to tell them. Things seem to be looking up, with Karen even receiving a pay raise at the greenhouse.

However, trouble soon looms over the horizon, after Jeff departs for a two-week vacation to Florida. Michael begins having nightmares, acting out, neglecting his chores and becoming harder to handle. Needing some answers, Terry asks Michael why, to which he types out "JEFF." Initially thinking it's related to Jeff being away, Terry is surprised when Michael further clarifies this by typing "KEEP JEFF AWAY."

When Terry curiously asks "Keep Jeff away? Why?", Michael, judging from his painful expression, types out the unthinkable: "SEX" (meaning he was molested), to which Terry responds "Oh, my God." in a shocked and horrified voice. Informed with this horrible news, an enraged Karen criticizes Terry for letting Jeff hurt Michael, and demands that she wants Michael immediately, and Eliot and Terry reluctantly agree. During a conversation, Michael enters the room, and Karen and Roger embrace Michael. At the computer, Michael types "I SHAME", but Karen tells Michael that he has nothing to be ashamed of, and says that what Jeff did was wrong. Karen demands that Michael be pulled from the school, saying that Michael would be safe from Jeff. Terry, however, protests against the idea by saying that Michael needs the school or something similar, and says that he made a lot of progress, despite being hurt by Jeff. She also says that pulling Michael from the school would be like punishing him for Jeff molesting him. Michael also expresses his desire to remain there: "I STAY". After Jeff is arrested, a detective is dispatched to the school and questions Michael about the abuse; believing him to be credible, he comments to Terry on how impressive this form of communication is before leaving.

All is not well for Karen, however. Feeling hurt that Michael had put his trust in Terry rather than his own mother, and despite Roger's gratitude that Michael actually told someone about the molestation, Karen has suddenly cut off all contact, not returning phone calls or showing up for visits and shutting herself up in the house.

Finally, Terry pays her a visit and explains that despite all the school has accomplished for Michael, he still needs Karen in his life, and that it's important for them to work together. This gets her to come around, and as they prepare for trial (an uphill battle, not helped by the double whammy of the court's reluctance to use facilitated communication to provide testimony and the fact that Jeff recanted his confession), Karen stresses to Terry how important it is that she help Michael "find his voice" in court.

After being established as a credible witness, Michael gets through questioning by the district attorney with no problem, but when cross-examined by Jeff's attorney, he has an episode on the witness stand, forcing the judge to call a recess. While the defense calls for a mistrial, a compromise is reached: another cross-examination will take place in a separate area, relayed back to the courtroom via closed-circuit TV, and without the presence of Jeff.

Asked by Karen if he wants to try again, Michael types "I CAN DO IT MOM", and the trial proceeds. Things go smoother this time, and in the end, Jeff is found guilty of performing a lewd act upon a child. Karen then relays the good news to Michael, and after hearing it, he types "WE WON", to which Karen happily replies, "Yes, we did." Michael hugs Karen, as Karen kisses him, and he continues playing on the swing.

The film ends with Karen and Terry watching Michael play on the swing, as Karen says, "He is a tough little kid." to which Terry humorously replies, "Wonder where he got that." Terry then says, "We have a long way to go with him." to which Karen replies, "We'll go together. We're a good team."

Cast
Patty Duke as Terry Wilson
Melissa Gilbert as Karen Barth
Bradley Pierce as Michael Barth
Markus Flanagan as Roger Barth
Lisa Banes as Marla Tolbert
Roger Aaron Brown as Eliot
Peter Spears as Jeff
Shelley Morrison as Lupe
Troy Evans

Production and release
The film was initially scheduled to air on September 25, 1994. However, CBS feared low ratings because another made-for-TV film, Kelsey Grammer's The Innocent, premiered the same night. It was pushed back three weeks. Upon its release, the film was criticized for its portrayal of an autistic child, but young Bradley Pierce received praise from all critics.

During the late 1990s and 2000s, the film was frequently rerun on Lifetime and its sister channel Lifetime Movie Network, and received a DVD release from MPI Home Video in 2007, as part of its "True Stories Collection".

References

External links

1994 television films
1994 drama films
1994 films
CBS network films
Films about autism
Films about child abuse
Facilitated communication
Films directed by Michael Switzer
American drama television films
1990s English-language films
1990s American films